Elbow Lake is a hamlet in the Canadian province of Saskatchewan.

The community is situated on the north-west corner of Elbow Lake in the Porcupine Hills.

Demographics 

See also
List of communities in Saskatchewan

References 

Designated places in Saskatchewan
Hudson Bay No. 394, Saskatchewan
Organized hamlets in Saskatchewan